Bleach is the generic name for any chemical product that is used industrially or domestically to remove color (whitening) from a fabric or fiber or to clean or to remove stains in a process called bleaching.  It often refers specifically to a dilute solution of sodium hypochlorite, also called "liquid bleach".

Many bleaches have broad spectrum bactericidal properties, making them useful for disinfecting and sterilizing. They are used in swimming pool sanitation to control bacteria, viruses, and algae, and in many places where sterile conditions are required. They are also used in many industrial processes, notably in the bleaching of wood pulp. Bleaches also have other minor uses like removing mildew, killing weeds, and increasing the longevity of cut flowers.

Bleaches work by reacting with many colored organic compounds, such as natural pigments, and turning them into colorless ones.  While most bleaches are oxidizing agents (chemicals that can remove electrons from other molecules), some are reducing agents (that donate electrons).

Chlorine, a powerful oxidizer, is the active agent in many household bleaches. Since pure chlorine is a toxic corrosive gas, these products usually contain hypochlorite, which releases chlorine. "Bleaching powder" usually means a formulation containing calcium hypochlorite.

Oxidizing bleaching agents that do not contain chlorine are usually based on peroxides such as hydrogen peroxide, sodium percarbonate, and sodium perborate. These bleaches are called "non-chlorine bleach", "oxygen bleach", or "color-safe bleach".

Reducing bleaches have niche uses, such as sulfur dioxide used to bleach wool, either as gas or from solutions of sodium dithionite; and sodium borohydride.

Bleaches generally react with many other organic substances besides the intended colored pigments, so they can weaken or damage natural materials like fibers, cloth, and leather, and intentionally applied dyes such as the indigo of denim. For the same reason, ingestion of the products, breathing of the fumes, or contact with skin or eyes can cause health damage.

History 

The earliest form of bleaching involved spreading fabrics and cloth out in a bleachfield to be whitened by the action of the sun and water. In the 17th century, there was a significant cloth bleaching industry in  Western Europe, using alternating alkaline baths (generally lye) and acid baths (such as lactic acid from sour milk, and later diluted sulfuric acid). The whole process lasted up to six months.

Chlorine-based bleaches, which shortened that process from months to hours, were invented in Europe in the late 18th century. Swedish chemist Carl Wilhelm Scheele discovered chlorine in 1774, and in 1785 French scientist Claude Berthollet recognized that it could be used to bleach fabrics. Berthollet also discovered sodium hypochlorite, which became the first commercial bleach, named Eau de Javel ("Javel water") after the borough of Javel, near Paris, where it was produced. 

Scottish chemist and industrialist Charles Tennant proposed in 1798 a solution of calcium hypochlorite as an alternative for Javel water, and patented bleaching powder (solid calcium hypochlorite) in 1799. Around 1820, French chemist Antoine Germain Labarraque discovered the disinfecting and deodorizing ability of hypochlorites, and was instrumental in popularizing their use for such purpose. His work greatly improved medical practice, public health, and the sanitary conditions in hospitals, slaughterhouses, and all industries dealing with animal products.

Louis Jacques Thénard first produced hydrogen peroxide in 1818 by reacting barium peroxide with nitric acid. Hydrogen peroxide was first used for bleaching in 1882, but did not become commercially important until after 1930. Sodium perborate as a laundry bleach has been used in Europe since the early twentieth century, and became popular in North America in the 1980s.

Mechanism of action

Whitening 
Colors of natural organic materials typically arise from organic pigments, such as beta carotene. Chemical bleaches work in one of two ways:
An oxidizing bleach works by breaking the chemical bonds that make up the chromophore. This changes the molecule into a different substance that either does not contain a chromophore or contains a chromophore that does not absorb visible light. This is the mechanism of bleaches based on chlorine but also of oxygen-anions which react through initial nucleophilic attack.
A reducing bleach works by converting double bonds in the chromophore into single bonds. This eliminates the ability of the chromophore to absorb visible light. This is the mechanism of bleaches based on sulfur dioxide.

Sunlight acts as a bleach through a process leading to similar results: high energy photons of light, often in the violet or ultraviolet range, can disrupt the bonds in the chromophore, rendering the resulting substance colorless. Extended exposure often leads to massive discoloration usually reducing the colors to white and typically very faded blue.

Antimicrobial efficacy 
The broad-spectrum effectiveness of most bleaches is due to their general chemical reactivity against organic compounds, rather than the selective inhibitory or toxic actions of antibiotics. They irreversibly denature or destroy many proteins, making them extremely versatile disinfectants.

Hypochlorite bleaches in low concentration were also found to attack bacteria by interfering with heat shock proteins on their walls. According to 2013 Home Hygiene and Health report, using bleach, whether chlorine- or peroxide-based, significantly increases germicidal efficiency of laundry even at low temperatures (30-40 degrees Celsius), which makes it possible to eliminate viruses, bacteria and fungi from variety of clothing in home setting.

Types of bleaches

Most industrial and household bleaches belong to three broad classes:
 Chlorine-based bleaches, whose active agent is chlorine, usually from the decomposition of some chlorine compound like hypochlorite or chloramine.
 Peroxide-based bleaches, whose active agent is oxygen, almost always from the decomposition of a peroxide compound like hydrogen peroxide.
 Sulfur dioxide based bleaches, whose active agent is sulfur dioxide, possibly from the decomposition of some oxosulfur anion.

Chlorine-based bleaches
Chlorine-based bleaches are found in many household "bleach" products, as well as in specialized products for hospitals, public health, water chlorination, and industrial processes.

The grade of chlorine-based bleaches is often expressed as percent active chlorine. One gram of a 100% active chlorine bleach has the same bleaching power as one gram of elemental chlorine.

The most common chlorine-based bleaches are:
 Sodium hypochlorite, usually as a 3–6% solution in water, usually called "liquid bleach" or just "bleach". Historically called "Javel water". It is used in many households to whiten laundry, disinfect hard surfaces in kitchens and bathrooms, treat water for drinking and keep swimming pools free of infectious agents.
 Bleaching powder (formerly known as "chlorinated lime"), usually a mixture of calcium hypochlorite, calcium hydroxide (slaked lime), and calcium chloride in variable amounts. Sold as a white powder or in tablets, is used in many of the same applications as sodium hypochlorite, but is more stable and contains more available chlorine.
 Chlorine gas. It is used as a disinfectant in water treatment, especially to make drinking water and in large public swimming pools. It was used extensively to bleach wood pulp, but this use has decreased significantly due to environmental concerns.
 Chlorine dioxide.  This unstable gas is generated in situ or stored as dilute aqueous solutions. It finds large-scale applications for the bleaching of wood pulp, fats and oils, cellulose, flour, textiles, beeswax, skin, and in a number of other industries.

Other examples of chlorine-based bleaches, used mostly as disinfectants, are monochloramine, halazone, and sodium dichloroisocyanurate.

Peroxide-based bleaches
Peroxide-based bleaches are characterized by the peroxide chemical group, namely two oxygen atoms connected by a single bond, (–O–O–). This bond is easily broken, giving rise to very reactive oxygen species, which are the active agents of the bleach.

The main products in this class are:
 Hydrogen peroxide itself. It is used, for example, to bleach wood pulp and hair or to prepare other bleaching agents like the perborates, percarbonates, peracids, etc.
 Sodium percarbonate, an adduct of hydrogen peroxide and sodium carbonate ("soda ash" or "washing soda").  Dissolved in water, it yields a solution of the two products, that combines the degreasing action of the carbonate with the bleaching action of the peroxide.
 Sodium perborate.  Dissolved in water it forms some hydrogen peroxide, but also the perborate anion which can perform nucleophilic oxidation.
 Peracetic (peroxoacetic) acid. Generated in situ by some laundry detergents, and also marketed for use as industrial and agricultural disinfection and water treatment.
 Benzoyl peroxide. It is used in topical medications for acne and to bleach flour.
 Ozone.  While not properly a peroxide, its mechanism of action is similar.  It is used in the manufacture of paper products, especially newsprint and white Kraft paper.
Potassium persulfate (K2 S2O8) and other persulfate salts. It, alongside ammonium and sodium persulfate, are common in hair lightening products.
Permanganate salts such as Potassium permanganate (KMnO4).

In the food industry, other oxidizing products like bromates are used as flour bleaching and maturing agents.

Reducing bleaches
Sodium dithionite (also known as sodium hydrosulfite) is one of the most important reductive bleaching agents. It is a white crystalline powder with a weak sulfurous odor. It can be obtained by reacting sodium bisulfite with zinc

2 NaHSO3 + Zn → Na2S2O4 + Zn(OH)2

It is used as such in some industrial dyeing processes to eliminate excess dye, residual oxide, and unintended pigments and for bleaching wood pulp.

Reaction of sodium dithionite with formaldehyde produces Rongalite,
Na2S2O4 + 2 CH2O + H2O → NaHOCH2SO3 + NaHOCH2SO2
which is used in bleaching wood pulp, cotton, wool, leather and clay.

Photographic bleach
In Reversal processing, residual silver in the emulsion after the first development is reduced to a soluble silver salt using a chemical bleach, most commonly EDTA. A conventional fixer then dissolves the reduced silver but leaving the unexposed silver halide intact. This unexposed halide is then exposed to light or is chemically treated so that a second development  produces a positive image. In colour and chromogenic film, this also generates a dye image in proportion to the silver. 

Photographic bleaches are also used in black-and-white photography to selectively reduce silver to reduce silver density in negatives or prints. In such cases the bleach composition is typically an acid solution of potassium dichromate.

Environmental impact 
A Risk Assessment Report (RAR) conducted by the European Union on sodium hypochlorite conducted under Regulation EEC 793/93 concluded that this substance is safe for the environment in all its current, normal uses. This is due to its high reactivity and instability. The disappearance of hypochlorite is practically immediate in the natural aquatic environment, reaching in a short time concentration as low as 10−22 μg/L or less in all emission scenarios. In addition, it was found that while volatile chlorine species may be relevant in some indoor scenarios, they have a negligible impact in open environmental conditions. Further, the role of hypochlorite pollution is assumed as negligible in soils.

Industrial bleaching agents can be sources of concern. For example, the use of elemental chlorine in the bleaching of wood pulp produces organochlorines and persistent organic pollutants, including dioxins. According to an industry group, the use of chlorine dioxide in these processes has reduced the dioxin generation to under detectable levels. However, respiratory risk from chlorine and highly toxic chlorinated byproducts still exists.

A European study conducted in 2008 indicated that sodium hypochlorite and organic chemicals (e.g., surfactants, fragrances) contained in several household cleaning products can react to generate chlorinated volatile organic compounds (VOCs). These chlorinated compounds are emitted during cleaning applications, some of which are toxic and probable human carcinogens. The study showed that indoor air concentrations significantly increase (8–52 times for chloroform and 1–1170 times for carbon tetrachloride, respectively, above baseline quantities in the household) during the use of bleach-containing products. The increase in chlorinated volatile organic compound concentrations was the lowest for plain bleach and the highest for the products in the form of "thick liquid and gel". 

The significant increases observed in indoor air concentrations of several chlorinated VOCs (especially carbon tetrachloride and chloroform) indicate that the bleach use may be a source that could be important in terms of inhalation exposure to these compounds. While the authors suggested that using these cleaning products may significantly increase the cancer risk, this conclusion appears to be hypothetical:

 The highest level cited for a concentration of carbon tetrachloride (seemingly of highest concern) is 459 micrograms per cubic meter, translating to 0.073 ppm (part per million), or 73 ppb (part per billion). The OSHA-allowable time-weighted average concentration over an eight-hour period is 10 ppm, almost 140 times higher;
 The OSHA highest allowable peak concentration (5-minute exposure for five minutes in a 4-hour period) is 200 ppm, twice as high as the reported highest peak level (from the headspace of a bottle of a sample of bleach plus detergent).

Disinfection 
Sodium hypochlorite solution, 3–6%, (common household bleach) is typically diluted for safe use when disinfecting surfaces and when used to treat drinking water.

A weak solution of 2% household bleach in warm water is typical for sanitizing smooth surfaces prior to the brewing of beer or wine.

US Government regulations (21 CFR 178 Subpart C) allow food processing equipment and food contact surfaces to be sanitized with solutions containing bleach, provided that the solution is allowed to drain adequately before contact with food, and that the solutions do not exceed 200 parts per million (ppm) available chlorine (for example, one tablespoon of typical household bleach containing 5.25% sodium hypochlorite, per gallon of water).

A 1-in-47 dilution of household bleach with water (1 part bleach to 47 parts water) is effective against many bacteria and some viruses in homes. Even "scientific-grade", commercially produced disinfection solutions such as Virocidin-X usually have sodium hypochlorite as their sole active ingredient, though they also contain surfactants (to prevent beading) and fragrances (to conceal the bleach smell).

See hypochlorous acid for a discussion of the mechanism for disinfectant action.

An oral rinse with a 0.05% dilute solution of household bleach is shown to treat gingivitis.

Diluted sodium hypochlorite at a rate of 2000–1 (0.05% concentration) may represent an efficacious, safe and affordable antimicrobial agent in the prevention and treatment of periodontal disease.

Color safe bleach
Color safe bleach is a chemical that uses hydrogen peroxide as the active ingredient (to help remove stains) rather than sodium hypochlorite or chlorine. It also has chemicals in it that help brighten colors. Hydrogen peroxide is also used for sterilization purposes and water treatment, but its disinfectant capabilities may be limited due to the concentration in the colorsafe bleach solution as compared to other applications.

Health hazards
The safety of bleaches depends on the compounds present, and their concentration.  Generally speaking, the ingestion of bleaches will cause damage to the esophagus and stomach, possibly leading to death.  On contact with the skin or eyes, it causes irritation, drying, and potentially burns. Inhalation of bleach fumes can damage the lungs. Personal protective equipment should always be used when using bleach. 

Bleach should never be mixed with vinegar or other acids, as this will create highly toxic chlorine gas, which can cause severe burns internally and externally. Mixing bleach with ammonia similarly produces toxic chloramine gas, which can burn the lungs. Mixing bleach with hydrogen peroxide results in an exothermic chemical reaction that releases oxygen, and may cause the contents to splatter and cause skin and eye injury. Heating bleach and boiling it may produce chlorates, strong oxidizers which may lead to a fire or explosion.

False claims as a cure

Miracle Mineral Supplement (MMS), also promoted as "Master Mineral Solution" or "Chlorine Dioxide Solution" or CDS, to evade restrictions by online retail platforms, is a bleach solution that has been fraudulently promoted as a cure-all since 2006. Its main active ingredient is sodium chlorite, which is "activated" with citric acid to form chlorine dioxide. In an attempt to evade health regulations, its inventor, former Scientologist, Jim Humble, formed the Genesis II Church of Health and Healing, a fake religion whose "sacrament" is MMS.

During the COVID-19 pandemic advocates of MMS, such as QAnon proponent Jordan Sather and Mark Grenon, who are affiliated with the Genesis II Church, began to suggest this would treat COVID-19. Several sources interpreted remarks by U.S. President Trump, in a 23 April 2020 briefing, as promoting this claim, leading the CDC, scientists, and bleach companies to re-state that bleach is harmful to humans and should not be ingested or injected. MSN News quoted Professor Rob Chilcott, a toxicology expert from the University of Hertfordshire, that there is no scientific evidence that injected bleach or disinfectants will affect viral particles, but that injecting bleach would "likely result in significant, irreversible harm and probably a very unpleasant death."

See also 
 Calcium hypochlorite
 Hydrogen peroxide
 Milton sterilizing fluid
 Tooth whitening
 Washing soda

References

Further reading 
 Bodkins, Dr. Bailey. Bleach. Philadelphia: Virginia Printing Press, 1995.
 Trotman, E. R. Textile Scouring and Bleaching. London: Charles Griffin & Co., 1968. .

External links 

 "Bleach" in the Encyclopædia Britannica
 Bleach (MSDS)

 
Disinfectants
Dyes
Household chemicals
Laundry substances